, is a video game production company headquartered in Yamashina Ward, Kyoto, Japan. It was founded in January 1977 by Fukiko Takahashi. It is best known for its Asura Blade fighting games - Asura Blade: Sword of Dynasty and its sequel Asura Buster: Eternal Warriors.

Notable works

Arcade
 Mosaic (1990, licensed from SPACE)
 Gulf War-II (1991, licensed from Comad Industry)
 Perestroika Girls (1993, licensed from Promat)
 Go! Go! Mile Smile (known as Susume! Mile Smile in Japan, 1995)
 Go! Go! Puzzle Bully (known as Gyakuten!! Puzzle Ban-Chō in Japan, 1996)
 Asura Blade: Sword of Dynasty (1998)
 Asura Buster: Eternal Warriors (2000)
 Head Panic (2000, licensed from ESD (Excellent Soft Design)
 Hakotsumi Max! (2009)

Game Boy Advance
 Zero-One (2003)
 Zero-One SP (2004)
 Yōkaidō (2002)

References

External links
 

Video game companies established in 1977
Video game companies of Japan